The Brown Homestead (also known as the Brown-Jouppien House) is a designated heritage property located on 1317 Pelham Road, St. Catharines, Ontario. The dwelling is an example of Loyalist Georgian architecture. It is the oldest residence remaining in the city, as it was first constructed in 1796. The Brown Homestead was expanded through an addition completed in 1802. At the time of construction, Pelham Road was a stagecouch route.

History 
In 1784, land was purchased in the Niagara Peninsula from the Mississaugas by the British government with the intent of Loyalist resettlement after the American Revolution. Land patents were then issued to individuals who built permanent dwellings on the land that was issued to them; this was the case with John Brown and his family. Brown had served the British crown and was a private in Captain Lewis Genevay's Company of the Butler's Rangers. Brown's property in upstate New York was confiscated by the state and he was eventually granted 900 acres of land in the townships of Thorold, Pelham and Louth. 

After John Brown's death, there were numerous owners. Initially, it was inherited by Adam Brown. In 1858, Brown sold it to Joseph Chellew. In 1912, Chellow sold it to Lafontaine Powers. In turn, the property was bought by Jon Jouppien in 1979, who performed renovations to the house itself. As of 2015, it has been owned by the John Brown Heritage Foundation.

Recent use 
In 2022, the Willowbank School of Restoration Arts in Queenston received funds that were to be used in part for local community projects, such as historic restoration of the Brown Homestead. After the restoration projects have been completed, it is planned to be used as a community or educational-related venue. The property began hosting a community garden named after victory gardens in 2022. The resulting produce was donated to local food banks.

See also 
 DeCew House
 Short Hills Provincial Park
 St. Catharines Armoury
 List of oldest buildings in Canada

References  

Designated heritage properties in Ontario
Buildings and structures in St. Catharines